Croatian National Council of the Republic of Serbia is the representative body of Croats in Serbia, established for the protection of the rights and the minority self-government of Croats in Serbia.

It represents Croatian national minority in the official use of language, education, information and culture, participates in decision-making or decide on issues and establishes institutions in these areas.

History 

It was established under the Act on Protection of Rights and Freedoms of National Minorities.

Although Council was officially established on constitutive session on 23 January 2003, aldermen which established Council were elected on electoral congress which happened on 15 December 2002 in Subotica.

Organs

Councilors 

Croatian National Council has 29 councilors, who elect president and vice presidents.

President 

President represents Croatian National Council and he is elected by councilors. Current president is Jasna Vojnić, and previous president was Slaven Bačić.

Vice presidents 

Croatian National Council has 4 vice presidents. Council elect them from among its members, on basis of territorial representation. 1 vice president comes from Syrmia, 1 from Podunavlje, 1 from Sombor and 1 from Subotica. They assist the president of Council in performance of chores from their scope, according to territory they were elected.

Current vice presidents are: Andrija Ađin (from Podunavlje), Andrija Kopilović (from Subotica), Mata Matarić (from Sombor) and Zlatko Načev (from Syrmia).

Executive board 

Executive board prepares and implements decisions of Croatian National Council. It has 6 members: president, vice president and 4 other members (for area of culture, education, informing and official use of Croatian language).

Current members are: Darko Sarić Lukendić (president), Petar Balažević (vice president), Andrej Španović (culture), Anđela Horvat (education), Ankica Jukić Mandić (informing) and Ivan Stipić (official use of language and letter).

Committees  

HNV has 7 constant committees: for education, culture, informing, official use of language, finances, budget, regulations and for representatives and complaints.

There are also committees for economy, sport and for enrollment in special electoral list of Croatian minority.

Secretary 

Secretary cares for legality of Council work and he prepares proposals of decisions of Council. Current secretary is Željko Pakledinac.

Number of electors by settlement (on 15 December 2002) 

 91 electors: Subotica
 19 electors: Tavankut
 15 electors: Sombor
 10 electors: Bajmok
 6 electors: Đurđin, Palić, Stari Žednik
 5 electors: Mala Bosna
 4 electors: Bački Breg, Bački Monoštor, Ljutovo
 3 electors: Golubinci, Petrovaradin, Novi Slankamen, Sonta, Sremska Mitrovica
 2 electors: Belgrade, Novi Beograd, Novi Sad, Sremska Kamenica
 1 elector: Banatsko Novo Selo, Belegiš, Bezdan, Bikovo, Novi Banovci, Ruma, Stara Pazova, Surčin

Institutions 

 Hrvatska riječ, Croatian language weekly newspaper
 Department for culture of Croats of Vojvodina, cultural institution

Symbols

Flag and coat of arms

Logo 
Logo of Council consists of red square in upper left corner, which is derived from Croatian coat of arms, and stylised letters hnv in bottom. Letters h and v are blue and letter n is gray. Logo was designed by Darko Vuković (from Novi Sad) and adopted on 10 September 2010.

References

External links
 Bunjevac Croatian Cultural and Educational Society in Serbia, Matija Gubec Tavankut
 Croatian Cultural Centre "Bunjevačko kolo" for Croats, Bunjevci, and Sokci in Serbia 
 Ivan Ivanić: O Bunjevcima (Subotica, 1894)
 Hrvatska revija br. 3/2005. Proslava 250. obljetnice doseljavanja veće skupine Bunjevaca (1686.-1936.) – Bunjevci u jugoslavenskoj državi

Croats of Serbia
Organizations established in 2002
2002 establishments in Serbia